Gordana Baric is a former international lawn bowls competitor for Australia. 

In 1996 she won the gold medal in the fours and silver medal in the triples at the 1996 World Outdoor Bowls Championship in Adelaide. Two years later she won a bronze medal at the 1998 Commonwealth Games in the pairs with Willow Fong.

References

1944 births
Australian female bowls players
Bowls World Champions
Bowls players at the 1998 Commonwealth Games
Bowls players at the 2002 Commonwealth Games
Commonwealth Games bronze medallists for Australia
Commonwealth Games medallists in lawn bowls
Living people
20th-century Australian women
Medallists at the 1998 Commonwealth Games